Tor Seidler (born 1952 in Littleton, New Hampshire) is an American author of children's literature. Many of his books feature anthropomorphic animals. Mean Margaret was nominated for a National Book Award, The Wainscott Weasel was named a Notable Children's Book by the American Library Association, and A Rat's Tale was named Best Book of the Year by Publishers Weekly. In 1998, A Rat's Tale was adapted into a puppet film by Augsburger Puppenkiste and distributed by Warner Bros. Family Entertainment. 20th Century Fox Animation and Blue Sky Studios planned to adapt The Wainscott Weasel into a movie, which started development in 2003. However, Fox shelved the concept in 2006.

He studied literature at Stanford University.

Published books 

 The Dulcimer Boy (1979)
 Terpin (1982)
 A Rat's Tale (1985)
The Tar Pit (1987)
Take a Good Look (1990)
 The Steadfast Tin Soldier (HarperCollins, 1992) – picture book illustrated by Fred Marcellino, retelling the 1838 fairy tale by Hans Christian Andersen, 
The Wainscott Weasel (1993)
Mean Margaret (1997)
The Silent Spinbills (1998)
The Revenge of Randal Reese-Rat (2001)
The Brothers Below Zero (2002)
Brain Boy and the Death Master (2003)
Toes (2006)
 Gully's Travels (Scholastic, 2008),  
Firstborn (2015)

References

External links

  
 
 

1952 births
American children's writers
Living people
Stanford University alumni
Writers from New Hampshire
Writers from New York City
Lakeside School alumni
American male novelists
People from Littleton, New Hampshire